Jacob Read (1752 – July 17, 1816) was an American lawyer and politician from Charleston, South Carolina. He represented South Carolina in both the Continental Congress (1783–1785) and the United States Senate (1795–1801).

Biography
Read was born at "Hobcaw" plantation in Christ Church Parish, near Charleston, South Carolina, in 1752. After he completed preparatory studies, he studied law and was admitted to the bar. He also studied in England from 1773 to 1776. He joined other Americans in London in 1774 in a petition against the Boston port bill.

Career
When Read returned to the United States, he served South Carolina in various military and civil capacities during the Revolutionary War. He was sent with other Americans as a prisoner of the British to St. Augustine from 1780 to 1781. He was a member of the State assembly in 1782, and of the privy council in 1783. He served as a Member of the Continental Congress from 1783 to 1785, and was a member of the South Carolina House of Representatives from St. Philip's and St. Michael's Parish. His service in the state lower house lasted from January 8, 1782 to December 17, 1794, and served as Speaker for the last five years in that house.

Elected as a Federalist to the United States Senate, Read served a single term from March 4, 1795, to March 3, 1801. He served as President pro tempore of the Senate during the Fifth Congress for about a month, but was an unsuccessful candidate for reelection. He was succeeded by Democratic-Republican John E. Colhoun.

Death
Read died in Charleston, South Carolina, on July 17, 1816 (age about 64 years). He is interred in the Bond/Read family cemetery at "Hobcaw," in Christ Church Parish, near Charleston.

References

External links 

 
 

1752 births
1816 deaths
Continental Congressmen from South Carolina
18th-century American politicians
United States senators from South Carolina
Presidents pro tempore of the United States Senate
South Carolina Federalists
Federalist Party United States senators